Horst Tüller (5 February 1931 – 4 June 2001) was a former road and track cyclist from Germany, who won the bronze medal in the men's team road race at the 1956 Summer Olympics in Melbourne, Australia, along with Reinhold Pommer and Gustav-Adolf Schur.

References

External links
 
 

1931 births
2001 deaths
German male cyclists
Olympic bronze medalists for the United Team of Germany
Cyclists at the 1956 Summer Olympics
Olympic cyclists of the United Team of Germany
Olympic medalists in cycling
Sportspeople from Wuppertal
Medalists at the 1956 Summer Olympics
Cyclists from North Rhine-Westphalia